A dovetail joint is a woodworking joinery technique.

Dovetail Joint may also refer to:
 Dovetail Joint (band), a Chicago-based band